read is a command found on Unix and Unix-like operating systems such as Linux. It reads a line of input from standard input or a file passed as an argument to its -u flag, and assigns it to a variable.

In Unix shells, like Bash, it is present as a shell built in function, and not as a separate executable file.

References

Standard Unix programs
Unix process- and task-management-related software
IBM i Qshell commands